Yuli Paola Verdugo Osuna (born 29 June 1997) is a Mexican female track cyclist, representing Mexico at international competitions. She won the gold medal at the 2016 Pan American Track Cycling Championships in the team sprint.

Career results
2016
Pan American Track Championships
1st  Team Sprint (with Jessica Salazar)
2nd  Sprint
Copa Cuba de Pista
1st Keirin
1st Sprint
1st 500m Time Trial

References

External links

1997 births
Living people
Mexican female cyclists
Mexican track cyclists
Sportspeople from Baja California Sur
Cyclists at the 2019 Pan American Games
Pan American Games medalists in cycling
Pan American Games bronze medalists for Mexico
People from La Paz, Baja California Sur
Medalists at the 2019 Pan American Games
Olympic cyclists of Mexico
Cyclists at the 2020 Summer Olympics
20th-century Mexican women
21st-century Mexican women
Competitors at the 2018 Central American and Caribbean Games